Hwang In-young (born November 23, 1978) is a South Korean actress. She officially made her acting debut in 1999, and has since starred in films, television series and theater.

Hwang also launched the fashion shop 175.5 in 2005, the internet shopping mall White Soda in 2007, and the clothing brand Voet in 2008.

Personal life
She married musical actor Ryu Jung-han in a private ceremony with only family members present March 13, 2017.

Filmography

Film

Television series

Variety and radio shows

Theater

Awards and nominations

References

External links 
 
  
 Hwang In-young Fan Cafe at Daum 
 
 
 
 
 

1978 births
Living people
South Korean television actresses
South Korean film actresses
South Korean stage actresses